Into the Fire is a 2005 Independent drama film from first-time director Michael Phelan that stars Sean Patrick Flanery, JoBeth Williams, and Melina Kanakaredes.

Plot
In the immediate aftermath of the September 11, 2001 terrorist attacks, three New Yorkers respond to a new tragedy.  June Sickles Fiorilli (JoBeth Williams) lost her firefighter son on 9-11 and now lives with her granddaughter Quinn, not far from the very firehouse that her boy called home.  Walter Hartwig (Sean Patrick Flanery) is the lieutenant in charge on the night a jumbo jet crashes on final approach into Kennedy Airport, intertwining him to June and music teacher Catrina Hampton (Melina Kanakaredes), who is awaiting the arrival of her twin sister.

Critical response
Of Into the Fire, Jeffrey Lyons said "It is an intelligent, compelling film" remarking that "JoBeth Williams gives one of her best, most complex performances." New York Magazine said Flanery's "strong performance grounds the film".

See also
 List of firefighting films

References

External links

2005 films
2005 television films
Films based on the September 11 attacks
Films about firefighting
Films set in New York City
Films shot in New York City
American independent films
2005 directorial debut films
2005 drama films
2005 independent films
American drama television films
2000s English-language films
2000s American films